Benkovski is a village in the Avren Municipality in Varna Province in Northeast Bulgaria. The village is home to over 650 permanent residents, with roughly 40 temporary or seasonal residents.

Village life
The village holiday falls on the last Sunday of September. There are several institutions that support local village life; the Zora Community Center, a kindergarten, an Aerobics club for both youth and adults, and a football club.

Economy
Agriculture is the main industry in the village, with a focus on plum and sour cherry orchards. The SECASTA Company produces carved stone from a quarry near the village for the manufacture of fireplaces and is a major distributor of Deauville Fireplace products. There are also two furniture-making companies, a yacht sail making and repair workshop and a commercial snail farm in the village.

Villages in Varna Province